The Brit Award for International Female Solo Artist is an award given by the British Phonographic Industry (BPI), an organisation which represents record companies and artists in the United Kingdom. The accolade is presented at the Brit Awards, an annual celebration of British and international music. The winners and nominees are determined by the Brit Awards voting academy with over one-thousand members, which comprise record labels, publishers, managers, agents, media, and previous winners and nominees.

History
The award was first presented in 1989 as International Female Solo Artist. The accolade was not handed out at the 1990, 1992 and 1993 ceremonies, with the award for International Solo Artist (given to a male or female artist) being awarded instead. The award for International Female Solo Artist was reinstated in 1994, and has been given ever since.

Björk is the artist with the most wins and nominations in the category, with four awards won out of nine nominations. Artists from the United States have won the accolade eleven times, more than any other country.

Winners and nominees

Artists with multiple wins

Artists with multiple nominations

9 nominations
 Björk

8 nominations

 Alicia Keys
 Kylie Minogue

6 nominations

 Beyoncé
 Pink
 Rihanna

5 nominations
 Madonna

4 nominations

 Mariah Carey
 Lana Del Rey
 Ariana Grande
 Taylor Swift

3 nominations

 Celine Dion
 Missy Elliott
 Whitney Houston
 Janet Jackson
 Lady Gaga
 Katy Perry

2 nominations

 Christina Aguilera
 Anastacia
 Camila Cabello
 Cat Power
 Neneh Cherry
 Christine and the Queens
 Sheryl Crow
 Billie Eilish
 Feist
 Nelly Furtado
 Norah Jones
 k.d. lang
 Lorde
 Janelle Monáe
 Alanis Morissette
 Sinéad O'Connor
 Sia
 Britney Spears
 Tina Turner

See also
 List of music awards honoring women

Notes
 Tracy Chapman (1989), Björk (1994), Natalie Imbruglia (1999), Macy Gray (2000), Lady Gaga (2010) also won Brit Award for International Breakthrough Act
 Billie Eilish (2022) also won Brit Award for International Solo Artist

References

Brit Awards
Music awards honoring women
Awards established in 1989
Awards established in 1991
Awards established in 1994
Awards disestablished in 1989
Awards disestablished in 1991
Awards disestablished in 2021